Edin Džeko (born 17 March 1986) is a Bosnian professional footballer who plays as a striker for  club Inter Milan and captains the Bosnia and Herzegovina national team.

Džeko was named Bosnian Footballer of the Year for three years in a row. He has been nicknamed "Bosnian Diamond" or simply "Diamond" (Dijamant) by football fans and journalists in Bosnia and Herzegovina. Prior to joining Inter Milan, he played for Manchester City and Roma, but he made a name for himself while playing for German club VfL Wolfsburg, with whom he won the Bundesliga in the 2008–09 season. He was second-highest goalscorer with 26 goals. In the 2009–10 season, Džeko was the top scorer with 22 goals. He also registered ten assists in both seasons.

During the 2011–12 Premier League season, Džeko scored four goals in one game for Manchester City against Tottenham Hotspur at White Hart Lane. On the final day of that season, he scored an equaliser against Queens Park Rangers in the 92nd minute, before Sergio Agüero won it for City with seconds to go, ensuring the team won a league title for the first time in 44 years. He later stated that the goal was one of the most important of his career. On 3 March 2018, Džeko scored his 50th league goal for Roma, thus becoming the first player ever to score 50 goals in three of Europe's top five major leagues.

A former youth international for Bosnia and Herzegovina, Džeko made his senior international debut in 2007, earning over 120 caps and scoring 64 goals since. Džeko became the highest Bosnia and Herzegovina goalscorer of all time on 7 September 2012 in a game against Liechtenstein where he scored a hat-trick to surpass Zvjezdan Misimović and Elvir Bolić. On 11 September 2018, in a game against Austria, he played his 95th game for Bosnia and Herzegovina and surpassed Emir Spahić to become the country's most-capped player. His ten goals in the qualifying campaign helped his national team qualify for its first international tournament, the 2014 FIFA World Cup.

Club career

Early career
Džeko began his career at Željezničar, playing as a midfielder between 2003 and 2005, but with little success playing in that position. He was widely regarded as too tall, and with poor technical abilities. Džeko's coach at the time though, Jiří Plíšek, saw his potential and when Plíšek returned home, he advised Teplice to buy him. Željezničar accepted a bid of just €25,000 for Džeko, one of Željezničar's directors saying years later, "[we] thought we won the lottery".

Džeko had a loan spell with Ústí nad Labem in 2005, during which he scored six goals in 15 games. Later that year, he moved back to Teplice, staying there until 2007. With 13 goals in 30 games, he was the second-top goalscorer of the Czech League in the 2006–07 season. Due to his performances, VfL Wolfsburg manager Felix Magath signed him for €4 million.

VfL Wolfsburg

After moving to Wolfsburg, Džeko scored five goals and recorded three assists in his first 11 games: he was named by Sportal as the best striker in the first half of the 2007–08 Bundesliga season. During his first season in Germany, Wolfsburg finished in fifth place, qualifying for a UEFA Cup spot for the following season. Džeko finished the 2007–08 season with eight goals and seven assists in 17 games started.

After Wolfsburg acquired fellow Bosnian international Zvjezdan Misimović in July 2008, Džeko's performances improved significantly. During the first half of the 2008–09 Bundesliga season Džeko scored five goals and added seven assists, but after the winter break he added 21 goals and three more assists. This upturn was especially visible during their ten-game winning streak from 7 February to 26 April, in which he scored 11 goals and added an assist. In May 2009 Džeko scored a hat-trick against Hoffenheim, and did so again two weeks later against Hannover 96, contributing 26 goals and 10 assists overall in 32 league matches. His goal tally was second only to teammate Grafite, with whom he formed the most successful strike duo in Bundesliga history; Misimović, the team's main assist and key pass provider, himself broke a longstanding Bundesliga record for assists by setting up 20 goals, the three players becoming known as "the magic triangle". Wolfsburg ended the season as Bundesliga champions for the first time in the club's history; they finished two points clear of Bayern Munich, the key match being the meeting between them on the 26th matchday which finished 5–1, Džeko and Grafite scoring two goals each in an impressive performance (the latter added his second and the team's fifth with a memorable dribble and backheel). At that point Wolfsburg, in third at the start of the day, gained the lead in the table for the first time and retained the position for the rest of the season to take the title.

In the DFB-Pokal, Džeko scored six goals in two matches, and in the UEFA Cup, four goals and two assists in eight matches. These performances resulted in him being given the Bundesliga Players' Footballer of the Year award. Despite attracting interest from A.C. Milan Džeko decided to stay, renewing his contract until June 2013.

He scored his first UEFA Champions League goal on 30 September 2009 against Manchester United in a 2–1 defeat at Old Trafford. He was one of 30 players nominated for the 2009 Ballon d'Or. He was the Bundesliga top scorer in the 2009–10 season with 22 goals.

On 28 August 2010, Džeko became the top league scorer in Wolfsburg's history with 59 goals in 96 appearances, surpassing Diego Klimowicz who scored 57 in 149 games. At the winter break stage of the 2010–11 Bundesliga season, Džeko had scored 10 goals in 17 matches.

Manchester City
After heavy speculation, Roberto Mancini, manager of Manchester City, confirmed on 3 January 2011 that a fee of £27 million (€32 million) had been agreed with Wolfsburg for Džeko, which was City's second highest transfer figure, after Robinho's £32.5 million (€42.5 million) move from Real Madrid in 2008. The transfer fee was the sixth highest in the Premier League history at the time. Also, the sum broke the Bundesliga record departure transfer fee, Bosnian record transfer fee, as well as that of any player from former Yugoslavia at the time. The previous ex-Yugoslav record stood for more than a decade – the transfer fee paid by Real Madrid to Fenerbahçe for Elvir Baljić in 1999 (€26 million). In August 2014 he signed a new four-year deal with the club, taking his contract up to 2018.

2010–11 season

Following his medical examination in London, he travelled to Manchester on 5 January, and on 7 January, Džeko was confirmed as a Manchester City player, joining the club on a four-and-a-half-year deal.

He made his debut for the club in a 4–3 win over Wolverhampton Wanderers on 15 January in which he set up Yaya Touré for the third goal of the match. Džeko marked his FA Cup debut on 30 January 2011 with the equalising goal in Manchester City's fourth round match against Notts County which ended in a 1–1 draw. In the replay on 20 February, Džeko again scored, helping Manchester City progress to the next round with a 5–0. Džeko scored twice against Aris Thessaloniki within four and a half minutes at the Etihad Stadium in the second leg of the last 32 of the UEFA Europa League on 24 February 2011.

On 25 April 2011, Džeko scored his first Premier League goal with a right footed finish against Blackburn Rovers at Ewood Park. This was the only goal of the game in a 1–0 win for Manchester City

His last goal was against Bolton Wanderers on the final day of the season and guaranteed City third place in the Premier League over Arsenal and automatic qualification into the group stage of the 2011–12 UEFA Champions League.

On 14 May 2011, Džeko was an unused substitute in Manchester City's 1–0 win over Stoke City the 2011 FA Cup Final, winning his first trophy with the club.

2011–12 season

Džeko started his second season with City by scoring the team's second goal in a 2–3 defeat against Manchester United in the FA Community Shield. In his third Premier League game of this season, Džeko scored four goals against Tottenham. In this game, Džeko broke another record by becoming the first Manchester City player to score four goals in one Premier League match. His tally of six league goals in three games won him the Premier League Player of the Month award for August.

Further on, he grabbed some important goals such as a header against Wigan Athletic that sealed a 1–0 win for City and extended their lead over title rivals Manchester United to three points, and a goal that put Manchester City 2–0 up against Porto in the Europa League, as they won 6–1 on aggregate. He also scored a headed goal against Blackburn Rovers, which put Manchester City 3–0 up, and sealed the game, this subsequently maintained City's narrow two-point margin over Manchester United.

Bosnia and Herzegovina national manager Safet Sušić urged Džeko to leave City at the end of the season because of lack of first-team football towards the end of the season, with the likes of Juventus and Bayern Munich interested. On the final day of the season, Džeko scored a 92nd-minute equaliser before Sergio Agüero scored in the 94th minute to beat Queens Park Rangers 3–2 and secure the Premier League title, the club's first in 44 years. Following his goal that helped win the championship, his 19th goal and 40th appearance in all competitions, Džeko's agent denied reports that the striker would leave City saying it was all media speculation.

2012–13 season

Džeko began the new 2012–13 season with an equalising goal against Southampton in a 3–2 win. He scored another goal against Queens Park Rangers taking his tally to two goals in the opening three games. He then scored the first goal of City's Champions League campaign against Real Madrid at the Santiago Bernabéu. On 29 September, he scored an 87th-minute winner away at Fulham, one minute after appearing as a substitute. On 20 October, he came off the bench in the 79th minute to score a minute later. He scored a second goal two minutes into stoppage time to seal a comeback win for 10-man City against West Bromwich. On 11 November, Džeko scored another late winning goal as a substitute with a left-footed volley in the 88th minute against Tottenham Hotspur. On 29 December 2012, he scored two goals against Norwich City in a 4–3 victory.

He finished the season with 14 goals in the Premier League and 15 overall.

2013–14 season
On the opening day of the 2013–14 Premier League season, Džeko was selected to start by a new manager Manuel Pellegrini against Newcastle United at the City of Manchester Stadium. He scored his first goal in a 3–2 defeat at Cardiff City. Džeko scored his 50th goal in England with an only goal of the game against Crystal Palace on 28 December 2013.

On 25 March 2014, Džeko scored twice in a 3–0 Manchester Derby win against Manchester United. His first goal came after just 43 seconds, making it the fastest away goal scored at Old Trafford in Premier League history. On 27 April, he scored City's first goal of a 2–0 defeat of Crystal Palace at Selhurst Park, closing the gap on league leaders Liverpool to three points with a game in hand.

He scored a brace in City's match at Everton on 3 May, helping City to a 3–2 win and lift the club to the top of the table with two matches left. His second goal of the game was Man City 150th goal in all competitions. In City's penultimate game of the season against Aston Villa, Džeko scored two second-half goals as City won 4–0, ensuring that the club would be crowned champions with a draw against West Ham United at home on the final day, which City eventually won.

2014–15 season
On 17 August 2014, Džeko assisted David Silva for Manchester City's first goal of the 2014–15 season in a 2–0 defeat of Newcastle United. On 20 August, Džeko signed a new four-year contract with the club, tying him to Manchester City until 2018.

On 24 September, Džeko scored his first two goals of the season as Manchester City beat Sheffield Wednesday 7–0 in the third round of the Football League Cup. On 27 September, he again scored twice in Manchester City's 4–2 win away to Hull City to record his first goals of the Premier League season.

On 21 February 2015, Džeko ended a run of 15 matches without a goal by scoring Manchester City's third goal in a 5–0 home victory against Newcastle United.

Roma

After months of speculation during the 2015 summer transfer market, Džeko officially signed for Serie A outfit Roma on 12 August 2015, on a €4 million loan with an €11 million option to buy that would become mandatory after certain performance related goals were met. These clauses were activated on 1 October 2015, making Džeko a permanent member of Roma.

2015–16 season
He made his Serie A debut ten days after his move from Manchester City, playing the entirety of a 1–1 draw at Hellas Verona, and in his second appearance on 30 August, he scored the winning goal in the 79th minute to defeat reigning champions Juventus 2–1 at the Stadio Olimpico. On 21 February 2016, he scored his first brace for Roma, scoring the first and last goals in a 5–0 win over Palermo.

2016–17 season
After a relatively disappointing first season with the club, in which Džeko scored only 8 Serie A and 10 goals in all competitions for Roma, he started the 2016–17 season with 12 goals in 15 games, 17 goals in 20 overall, thus equaling the start of the season that Gabriel Batistuta had, in which he won the league title with Roma. On 24 November 2016, he scored a hat-trick in the Europa League, in a 4–1 win over Viktoria Plzeň. On 16 February 2017, he also scored a hat-trick in the first leg of a Europa League match against Villarreal, which Roma won 4–0. On 12 March 2017, he became the fourth Roma player to reach 30 goals in all competitions in a season.

On 1 April 2017, Džeko became the first Roma player ever to reach 33 goals in a season in all competitions, surpassing the previous record of 32 goals jointly held by Rodolfo Volk and Francesco Totti. He ended the season with a tally of 39 goals in all competitions of which his 29 goals in Serie A made him the Capocannoniere for that season becoming the first Bosnian player to do so.

2017–18 season
Džeko started his third season at the Roman club with six goals in first five league games. He scored his first goal of the season against Inter Milan on 26 August 2017, which Roma lost 1–3. In the next two games, he scored two braces, against Verona and Benevento. He continued his goalscoring form by opening the score against A.C. Milan on 1 October, in a 2–0 win away at San Siro.

On 9 October, Džeko was one of 30 players to be nominated for the Ballon D'Or 2017 prize by French newspaper France Football.

Džeko then scored a brace against Chelsea at Stamford Bridge on 19 October. The game ended in a 3–3 draw. His next big game of the season came against Napoli, in which he scored a brace and helped his team to a 4–2 victory.

Džeko also helped Roma reach UEFA Champions League quarter-finals by scoring the winning goal against Shakhtar Donetsk. Džeko was instrumental in Roma's qualification to UEFA Champions League semi-finals, their first in over 30 years. He scored in both quarter-final legs against Barcelona, which Roma won on away goals. In the semi-finals, Džeko scored in both legs, but it wasn't enough, as Roma were eventually eliminated by Liverpool 6–7 on aggregate.

Džeko ended the season with 24 goals, 16 of which he scored in Serie A, making him club's best goalscorer in the league and joint sixth overall. He also added 8 goals in Champions League, which meant he ended as competition's fifth best goalscorer.

2018–19 season
Džeko started his fourth season with Roma by scoring a winning goal away at Torino on 19 August. Džeko scored his first UEFA Champions League hat-trick on 2 October when he again put three past Viktoria Plzeň, in the 2018–19 UEFA Champions League group stage. He became the first Bosnian to score a hat-trick in the top European club competition. 

On 13 April 2019, Džeko scored his 8th goal in the league against Udinese in the 68th minute, giving Roma a win. He scored his 9th league goal for Roma on 12 May 2019, in a 2–0 home win against league champions Juventus in the 90+3rd minute.

2019–20 season
During pre-season of the 2019–20 season, Džeko extended his contract with Roma until June 2022 on 16 August 2019. He scored his first official goal for the club in the new season on 25 August 2019, in a 3–3 home league draw against Genoa. On 22 September 2019, Džeko scored a 93rd minute goal in Roma's 1–2 away league win over Bologna.

In a game against Cagliari on 6 October 2019, Džeko fractured his zygomatic bone (cheekbone), needing to go get surgery and afterwards wear a protective mask in some of his first games after the recovery. He scored his 5th goal in the season for Roma in the club's 2–1 home league win against Milan on 27 October 2019. With a goal in a UEFA Europa League game against Wolfsberg on 12 December 2019, which Roma drew 2–2, Džeko helped his team qualify for the last 16 of the 2019–20 UEFA Europa League season.

He made his 200th appearance for the club in Roma's 3–1 home league win against S.P.A.L. on 15 December 2019.

Inter Milan
On 14 August 2021, Džeko joined Serie A club Inter Milan, but without being officially introduced he played a friendly match against Ukrainian club Dynamo Kyiv after being named in the starting line-up, and scored his side's second goal during a 3–0 home win. Later that day, Inter announced that he had signed a two-year deal. He scored his first goal for the club in a 4–0 win against Genoa.

On 4 January 2023, Džeko scored the only goal of the match against championship leaders Napoli, giving them their first league defeat for the 2022–23 season. Fourteen days later, he scored in the 3–0 win over Milan in the 2022 Supercoppa Italiana and was named Man of the Match; with this goal he became the oldest goalscorer (36 years and 307 days) of the competition, breaking the previous record set by Cristiano Ronaldo (35 years and 350 days) in 2020.

International career

Džeko's first appearance for his home country came with the Bosnia and Herzegovina national under-19 football team. He was also part of the under-21 team who played in the play-offs for UEFA European Under-21 Championship hosted by the Netherlands in 2007. Bosnia's first challenges in this competition were Armenia under-21 and Norway under-21. They beat Armenia 3–2 and drew with Norway 1–1, qualifying for the playoff against the Czech Republic under-21. In the first leg, Bosnia lost 2–1; in the second, the game ended in a 1–1 draw. Džeko scored one goal in the tournament.

He made his senior debut against Turkey on 2 June 2007. It was a memorable debut for the player, scoring a volleyed goal during the first half stoppage time. The goal levelled the score at 2–2 and Bosnia went on to win 3–2.

On 28 March 2009, Bosnian sports commentator, Marjan Mijajlović, named Džeko "the Bosnian Diamond" during a game versus Belgium in Genk in which he scored a remarkable goal.

He scored nine goals in 2010 FIFA World Cup qualifying and finished as the second highest goalscorer in 2010 FIFA World Cup qualification, tied with England's Wayne Rooney, behind Greek striker Theofanis Gekas' 10 goals.

On 8 September 2012, in an 8–1 win over Liechtenstein, Džeko scored his first hat-trick for the national team and at the same time became the leading goal scorer in the history of the Bosnia and Herzegovina national team with 24 goals. The record was previously held by Elvir Bolić who scored 22 goals.

Džeko ended the 2014 FIFA World Cup qualification campaign as second-top scorer with ten goals as Bosnia and Herzegovina qualified for the first major tournament in its history.

In June 2014, Džeko was named in Bosnian squad for the 2014 FIFA World Cup. He debuted in the team's opening group match, a narrow defeat to Argentina at the Maracanã Stadium. On 25 June with the team already eliminated, in the final group match against Iran, Džeko scored the opening goal to help Bosnia and Herzegovina to their first ever FIFA World Cup win.

In August, following the retirement of Emir Spahić from the international team, manager Safet Sušić named Džeko the new captain.

On 28 March 2015, Džeko netted his second international hat-trick, scoring all of the goals in a 3–0 away win over Andorra in UEFA Euro 2016 qualifying, their first win in five games of the qualification campaign.

On 13 November 2016, Džeko had an altercation in a 2018 FIFA World Cup qualifier against Greece with Greek player Kyriakos Papadopoulos, in which he pulled down Sokratis Papastathopoulos' shorts while trying to obtain the ball. The subsequent fight between the two teams saw both Džeko and Papadopoulos sent off. It was his first red card in the national jersey.

On 28 March 2017, Džeko became the first Bosnian player to score 50 international goals.

On 23 March 2019, he made his 100th appearance for Bosnia in a 2–1 win over Armenia in the UEFA Euro 2020 qualifiers.

Style of play
Džeko is renowned for his physical presence, strength and aerial ability. Considered by pundits and managers to be one of the best strikers in Europe, although he is mainly known for his goalscoring abilities, he is also a generous player, who has a penchant for providing a good number of assists in addition to scoring many goals. He is also known for shooting the ball with both feet equally well. Wherever he played, he posted impressive goalscoring records, playing mainly as a striker. His former Roma manager Luciano Spalletti once described him as the "perfect prototype" of a striker, noting that he is "strong, tall, fast for his height, combative, aggressive and has good technique." In his youth, he also played as a midfielder, and as a winger.

During his time with Manchester City, he was considered a "super-sub", as he scored many important goals coming off the bench, a label which he himself rejected on several occasions.

Personal life
Džeko was born in Sarajevo, SR Bosnia and Herzegovina, at that time part of SFR Yugoslavia, to Midhat and Belma Džeko. He stated that his family was always supportive throughout his career, especially his father, who took him to training sessions while he was at Željezničar. His father also played professionally in Bosnia and Herzegovina. Džeko is considered a local superstar in Sarajevo.

Džeko is multilingual, speaking five languages fluently: Bosnian, Czech, German, English and Italian. He is a Muslim, and has dual citizenship of Bosnia and Herzegovina and Croatia. Džeko stated that Milan has always been his favourite club and Andriy Shevchenko his favourite player. In his home in Sarajevo, he still has a Milan jersey with the number 7 (worn by Shevchenko while at the club) on the wall in his room. Džeko is a first cousin of former fellow national team player and former captain Emir Spahić.

In November 2009, Džeko became Bosnia's first UNICEF ambassador. He has since visited schools and children in his home country affected by the Bosnian War. On 6 July 2012, Džeko was accepted to the University of Sarajevo to study sport and physical education. On 10 September 2018, Džeko graduated with a bachelor's degree.

He has been in a relationship with model and actress, Amra Silajdžić since 2011, marrying her in 2014. In February 2016, he became a father of a girl named Una. His second child, a boy named Dani, was born on 9 September 2017. The couple announced on Instagram that they are expecting their third child, a baby girl. On 12 September 2020, the couple welcomed their third child, daughter Dalia.

Career statistics

Club

International

Honours
VfL Wolfsburg
Bundesliga: 2008–09

Manchester City
Premier League: 2011–12, 2013–14
FA Cup: 2010–11 
Football League Cup: 2013–14
FA Community Shield: 2012

Inter Milan
Coppa Italia: 2021–22
Supercoppa Italiana: 2021, 2022

Individual
Bosnian Sportsman of the Year: 2009, 2018
Bosnian Footballer of the Year: 2009, 2010, 2011
Castrol Performance Index EDGE Performance of the Month: August 2011
Bundesliga Players' Player of the Year: 2008–09
kicker Bundesliga Team of the Season: 2008–09, 2009–10
Bundesliga top scorer (Torschützenkönig): 2009–10
Serie A top scorer: 2016–17
UEFA Champions League Squad of the Season: 2017–18
UEFA Europa League Top Scorer: 2016–17
UEFA Europa League Squad of the Season: 2020–21
Premier League Player of the Month: August 2011
Roma Supporters' Player of the Season: 2017–18
DFB-Pokal Top Goalscorer: 2008–09

See also 
 List of top international men's football goalscorers by country
 List of men's footballers with 100 or more international caps
 List of men's footballers with 50 or more international goals

References

External links

Profile at the Inter Milan website

1986 births
Living people
Bosniaks of Bosnia and Herzegovina
Naturalized citizens of Croatia
Bosniaks of Croatia
Bosnia and Herzegovina Muslims
Croatian Muslims
Footballers from Sarajevo
Association football forwards
Bosnia and Herzegovina footballers
Croatian footballers
Bosnia and Herzegovina youth international footballers
Bosnia and Herzegovina under-21 international footballers
Bosnia and Herzegovina international footballers
2014 FIFA World Cup players
FIFA Century Club
FK Željezničar Sarajevo players
FK Teplice players
FK Ústí nad Labem players
VfL Wolfsburg players
Manchester City F.C. players
A.S. Roma players
Inter Milan players
Premier League of Bosnia and Herzegovina players
Czech First League players
Czech National Football League players
Bundesliga players
Premier League players
Serie A players
Kicker-Torjägerkanone Award winners
Bosnia and Herzegovina expatriate footballers
Expatriate footballers in the Czech Republic
Bosnia and Herzegovina expatriate sportspeople in the Czech Republic
Expatriate footballers in Germany
Bosnia and Herzegovina expatriate sportspeople in Germany
Expatriate footballers in England
Bosnia and Herzegovina expatriate sportspeople in England
Expatriate footballers in Italy
Bosnia and Herzegovina expatriate sportspeople in Italy
UNICEF Goodwill Ambassadors
FA Cup Final players